Obion County Schools is a school district headquartered in Union City, Tennessee. The district serves the entire county except for those served by the Union City Schools District.

Schools
 Elementary and Middle Schools
Black Oak Elementary in Hornbeak, Tennessee serving grades PK-8
Hillcrest Elementary in Troy, Tennessee serving grades PK-8
Lake Road Elementary in Union City, Tennessee serving grades PK-8
Ridgemont Elementary in Union City, Tennessee serving grades PK-8
South Fulton Elementary in South Fulton, Tennessee serving grades PK-5

 High Schools
Obion County Central High School in Troy, Tennessee serving grades 9-12

 Middle and High Schools
South Fulton Middle and High School in South Fulton, Tennessee serving grades 6-12

External links
 
Education in Obion County, Tennessee
School districts in Tennessee